Fabio De'Longhi (born 1967) is an Italian businessman and former CEO and General Manager of De'Longhi.

Early life
He was born in 1967, and is the son of Giuseppe De'Longhi. He studied economics at Bocconi University.

Career
He has been CEO of De'Longhi since 27 June 2005. The De'Longhi owns 57% of the shares.

On 1 May 2020 Fabio De'Longhi resigned as De'Longhi CEO and General Manager and handed over the responsibility to international top manager and former president EMEA of Barry Callebaut, Massimo Garavaglia.

Intensely private individual with no real background in to his private life known.

References

1967 births
Bocconi University alumni
Italian chief executives
Living people
People from Treviso
Date of birth missing (living people)
Place of birth missing (living people)
De'Longhi